The Autauga Northern Railroad  is a shortline operating between Maplesville, Alabama and a plant of the International Paper Company near Prattville, Alabama, . This trackage is leased from Norfolk Southern and was originally operated by the Mobile & Ohio, Gulf, Mobile & Ohio (GM&O), and Illinois Central Gulf railroads as part of their line between Montgomery, Alabama and Tuscaloosa, Alabama. In addition, Autauga Northern uses  of trackage rights over CSX, also ex-GM&O, to gain access into Montgomery. The lease from Norfolk Southern was approved in February 2011, and operations began in April 2011 as part of Watco.

Watco undertook a $2.39 million refurbishment of the railway after beginning operations to upgrade track to handle 25 mile-per-hour speeds. The railroad operates six days a week under Watco control, moving about 9,000 carloads per year.

References

Alabama railroads
Watco
Railway companies established in 2011
Spin-offs of the Norfolk Southern Railway
2011 establishments in Alabama